Caridad Svich (born July 30, 1963) is a playwright, songwriter/lyricist, translator, and editor who was born in the United States to Cuban-Argentine-Spanish-Croatian parents.

Biography
A member of the New York's New Dramatists, she earned her Bachelor of Fine Arts at the University of North Carolina at Charlotte and her Master of Fine Arts at the University of California, San Diego. She has written over forty full-length plays and fifteen translations as well as other short works. Svich has been a guest artist at the Traverse Theatre in Edinburgh and the Royal Court Theater and has taught playwriting workshops at Paines Plough Theater in London and the US-Cuba Writer's Conference in Havana.

Career
Caridad Svich is the founder of theatre alliance and publisher NoPassport. Her work has impacted communities of multiple diversities and has responded to the Deepwater Horizon oil spill, veterans and their families, survivors of trauma and those committed to artistic expression of advocacy for US Latin writing voices, and engagement with representations of the “fragile shores” in our lives, amongst others.

Svich sustains a career as a theatrical translator as well, mainly of the dramatic work of Federico García Lorca. She has received fellowships from the Radcliffe Institute for Advanced Study, NEA/TCG, PEW Charitable Trust, and California Arts Council. She has trained for four consecutive years with Maria Irene Fornes in INTAR Theatre's HPRL Lab.

Svich teaches creative writing and playwriting at Rutgers University–New Brunswick and Primary Stages’ Einhorn School of Performing Arts. She has been a guest lecturer at the Yale School of Drama and a visiting faculty member at Bennington College. She has also has taught playwriting at Bard College, Barnard College, Denison University, Ohio State University, ScriptWorks, University of California, San Diego, and Yale School of Drama.

Svich was the co-organizer and curator of After Orlando, a collection of new 3–to-5 minute plays responding to the 2016 shooting at Pulse nightclub. Over 40 theatrical institutions and universities nationwide and abroad participated.

In 2023 her play Arbor Falls was performed at Grinnell College.

Awards 

 2015 Source Festival (Washington D.C.) finalist
 2013 National Latino Playwrights Award
 2012 OBIE for Lifetime Achievement
 2012 Edgerton Foundation New Play Award
 2012 Finalist for the PEN Center USA Literary Award in Drama
 2011 American Theatre Critics Association Primus Prize
 2009 Lee Reynolds Award, League of Professional Theatre Women
 2009 HOLA Award for Outstanding Achievement in Playwriting
 2007 Whitfield Cook Award for New Writing
 2004 Selected for inclusion Oxford Encyclopedia of Latino History
 2003 National Latino Playwrights Award
 2002-2003 Harvard University Radcliffe Institute for Advanced Study Fellow
 2002-2003 TCG/Pew Charitable Trust National Theatre Artist Residency
 1997-1998 NEA/TCG Playwrights Residency
 1994 Rosenthal New Play Prize

Works or publications

Notes and references

External links

 
 The Caridad Svich papers are available at the Cuban Heritage Collection, University of Miami Libraries. This archival collection contains the personal and literary works of playwright Caridad Svich. The collection is organized into two series. Series 1 consists of original theater works as well as translations by Svich; materials related to theater productions, such as playbills, advertisements, clippings, and reviews; and articles about other playwrights. Series 2 consists of audiovisual material such as MiniDVs, CDs, and tapes containing presentations by Caridad Svich and performance soundtracks.
 Selected photographs from the Caridad Svich papers are available through the University of Miami Libraries Digital Collections portal.
 Creator page for Caridad Svich in the Cuban Theater Digital Archive.
Caridad Svich Collection  includes playscripts, correspondence, essays, and interviews.  Held by the Jerome Lawrence and Robert E. Lee Theatre Research Institute, The Ohio State University Libraries.

1963 births
Living people
American people of Cuban descent
American women dramatists and playwrights
University of North Carolina at Charlotte alumni
University of California, San Diego alumni
21st-century American women
Hispanic and Latino American dramatists and playwrights